Florence Cook was an American Democratic politician from Roxbury, Massachusetts. She represented the 12th Suffolk district in the Massachusetts House of Representatives from 1943 to 1946.

References

Year of birth missing
Year of death missing
Members of the Massachusetts House of Representatives
Women state legislators in Massachusetts
20th-century American women politicians
People from Roxbury, Boston
20th-century American politicians